Quentin Leite Pereira (born 21 April 1992) is a French footballer who plays as a midfielder for FC Differdange 03 in the Luxembourg National Division.

A former Sochaux youth team player, he played in the 2010 final of the Coupe Gambardella. He was signed to Stade de Reims in January 2012, and played six Ligue 2 games for the club as they won promotion out of Ligue 2 in 2011–12. He joined RC Épernay Champagne in the Championnat de France Amateur 2 for the 2015–16 season. He joined English club Port Vale in July 2016, though left the club in May 2017. Following a two-season break from the game he joined Andorran side UE Sant Julià for the start of the 2019–20 season, before quickly moving on to Differdange of Luxembourg.

Career

Early career
Pereira came through the Sochaux youth team, and was a 65-minute substitute for Petrus Boumal in the 2010 final of the Coupe Gambardella at the Stade de France, where Sochaux lost to Metz on penalties following a 1–1 draw. He scored two goals in 22 appearances for the reserve team in the Championnat de France amateur (fourth tier) in the 2010–11 season, helping them to qualify for the play-offs, where they were beaten by Olympique Lyonnais II. He then featured nine times in the 2011–12 season, as the team finished in 13th place.

He was signed by Stade de Reims in January 2012. He made his professional debut on 19 March, coming on for Kamel Ghilas 77 minutes into a 1–0 win over Le Mans at the MMArena. He started one game for the club, a 3–2 win over Boulogne at the Stade Auguste-Delaune on 1 May. Stade de Reims were promoted out of Ligue 2 as runners-up in 2011–12 under head coach Hubert Fournier, and Pereira never made it onto the pitch in Ligue 1. He requested a loan move, but his request was turned down by the club. He scored three goals in 17 Championnat de France Amateur 2 (CFA 2 - fifth tier) games for the Reserve team in the 2013–14 season. His contract was terminated in July 2014. He spent the second half of the 2015–16 season in CFA 2 with RC Épernay Champagne, and scored one goal in six matches as the club were relegated into the Regional Leagues (sixth tier).

Port Vale
Pereira signed a two-year contract with EFL League One club Port Vale in July 2016. He remained on the fringes of the first team at the start of the 2016–17 season, but put in a strong substitute appearance in a 2–2 draw with Peterborough United on 10 September that coach Andy Smith said would "will pickle [manager Bruno Ribeiro's] head on elections". However, he had only one league start to his name before he scored a hat-trick in a reserve team match with Morecambe in October, after which reserve team coach Michael Brown said Pereira was close to breaking into the first team. However speaking as caretaker-manager four months later, Brown said that "Pereira hasn't trained great for a long time now, he has not been near it". He left Port Vale following the club's relegation in May 2017 after he and Brown came to a mutual agreement to end his contract.

Sant Juliá and Differdange 03
In June 2019, Pereira signed with Andorran Primera Divisió side UE Sant Julià. He played both legs in their UEFA Europa League qualification preliminary round defeat to Gibraltan side Europa FC. Pereira left the club soon afterwards and instead joined FC Differdange 03 in Luxembourg's National Division.

Style of play
Speaking in July 2016, Pereira described himself as a midfielder who plays "a simple, technical game".

Career statistics

Honours
Sochaux II
Coupe Gambardella runner-up: 2010

References

1992 births
Living people
Footballers from Grand Est
Sportspeople from Reims
French footballers
French expatriate footballers
Association football midfielders
FC Sochaux-Montbéliard players
Stade de Reims players
RC Épernay Champagne players
Port Vale F.C. players
UE Sant Julià players
FC Differdange 03 players
Championnat National 2 players
Championnat National 3 players
Ligue 2 players
English Football League players
Luxembourg National Division players
French expatriate sportspeople in England
Expatriate footballers in England
French expatriate sportspeople in Andorra
Expatriate footballers in Andorra
French expatriate sportspeople in Luxembourg
Expatriate footballers in Luxembourg
French people of Portuguese descent